Neotomoxia curticornis is a species of beetle in the genus Neotomoxia of the family Mordellidae, which is part of the superfamily Tenebrionoidea. It was described in 1967.

References

Beetles described in 1967
Mordellidae